KM, Km, or km may stand for:

Postnominal
Knight of the Sovereign Military Order of Malta, a chivalric order

Businesses
KM Group, a multimedia group based in Kent
Kennis Music, a record label
Kia Motors, an automobile manufacturer
Kmart (former stock symbol "KM")
Konica Minolta, a manufacturer of electronics
Air Malta (IATA code KM)

Organisations
Knight of Malta (disambiguation), a Christian order of knighthood
Kriegsmarine, name of the German navy during the Nazi regime
Koninklijke Marine, Dutch name of the Royal Netherlands Navy

Places
Kamenz (district), Germany (license plate indication)
Messenia, Greece (license plate indication)
KM Junction, West Virginia
Comoros, country (ISO 3166-1 code KM)
Kysucké Nové Mesto, town in Slovakia (district code KM)
Kosovska Mitrovica, town in Serbia
Kosovo and Metohija, an autonomous province in Serbia (ISO 3166-2 code RS-KM)

Science, technology, and mathematics
Kilometre (km), SI unit of distance
.km, Internet top-level domain (ccTLD) for Comoros
Km, an electric motor constant
Kaplan–Meier estimator, a non-parametric statistic used to estimate the survival function
Kelley–Morse set theory, in mathematics, a set theory
Kernel methods, a set of computer science algorithms
KM, the Michaelis constant in Michaelis–Menten kinetics
Knowledge management, a range of techniques to identify, represent, and distribute knowledge

Other uses
 KM (wrestler), the ring name of American professional wrestler Kevin Matthew McDonald (born 1983)
Km (hieroglyph)
KM-mount, a Konica camera rangefinder mount
Khmer language (ISO 639 alpha-2 code "km")
KM, a Soviet ground-effect Ekranoplan vehicle, called the "Caspian Sea Monster"
KM, Key Map prefix used by the Houston Map Company and the City of Houston
Bosnia and Herzegovina convertible mark, currency of Bosnia and Herzegovina
Krause-Mishler numbers, catalogue number references for the Standard Catalog of World Coins by Krause Publications
Krav Maga, a self-defence and hand-to-hand combat system
Kylian Mbappé, French footballer